

Regular season

Player stats
Note: GP= Games played; G= Goals; A= Assists; PTS = Points; GW = Game Winning Goals; PPL = Power Play Goals; SHG = Short Handed Goals

Postseason
UMD took the inaugural NCAA Division I National Championship on March 25, 2001 by defeating St. Lawrence University by a score of 4–2.  This marked the first ever NCAA team championship for the Bulldogs.

Awards and honors
Maria Rooth was named Most Valuable Player of the NCAA tournament 
Tuula Puputti and Brittny Ralph were named to the all-tournament team.
On June 25, 2001, the Bulldogs were honored at the White House by President George W. Bush.  The Bulldogs were the first ever women's hockey team to be invited to the White House.

References

External links
Official site

Minnesota-Duluth
NCAA women's ice hockey Frozen Four seasons
NCAA women's ice hockey championship seasons
Minnesota Duluth Bulldogs women's ice hockey seasons